The Unissued Johnny Cash is a compilation album and 59th overall album by American country singer Johnny Cash, released on Bear Family Records in 1978 (see 1978 in music).  It is tailored to completist fans of Cash as it consists entirely of rare or unreleased material from Cash's early Columbia days.  The first four tracks, all recorded in August, 1958, are outtakes from The Fabulous Johnny Cash, and also appear on the CD re-release of that album.  Likewise, the outtake "The Fable of Willie Brown" appears on the re-release of Ride This Train. The Carter Family song "I'll Be All Smiles Tonight" is an outtake from Blood Sweat and Tears.

"Viel zu spät" and "Wo ist Zuhause, Mama" are re-recordings in German of hit songs by Cash.  At the time "Don't Take Your Guns to Town" and other country songs were seeing success in Germany, so Columbia had Cash record translations of "I Got Stripes" and "Five Feet High and Rising" for a single.  This was probably the first time a country singer recorded a song in a foreign language, but would lead to further recordings of songs in German.

Track listing
All songs written by Johnny Cash except where noted.

1978 compilation albums
Johnny Cash compilation albums
Bear Family Records compilation albums